George Dănuț Ganea (born 26 May 1999) is a Romanian professional footballer who plays as a forward for Liga I club FC U Craiova 1948.

Personal life
George Ganea is the son of former Romanian international Ionel Ganea.

Career Statistics

Club

Honours

Club
Rapid București
Liga II: 2015–16

Viitorul Constanța
Cupa României: 2018–19
Supercupa României: 2019

References

External links

1999 births
Footballers from Bucharest
Living people
Romanian footballers
Romania youth international footballers
Romania under-21 international footballers
Olympic footballers of Romania
Footballers at the 2020 Summer Olympics
Association football midfielders
Liga I players
Liga II players
FC Rapid București players
CFR Cluj players
FC Viitorul Constanța players
FCV Farul Constanța players
FC Argeș Pitești players
FC U Craiova 1948 players